Brit Lind-Petersen-McRoberts (born 10 February 1957), also known as Brit Townsend, is a Canadian former track and field athlete who competed in middle-distance running events.

Born in Copenhagen in Denmark, she later moved to Canada and represented her adoptive country internationally. She made her first appearances for Canada in 1979, placing seventh in the 800 metres at the Pan American Games, then sixth in the 1500 metres at the 1979 IAAF World Cup. Her first national title came in 1980, over 1500 m at the Canadian Track and Field Championships, and she would go on to win three further titles (800 m in 1981 and 1983, then a second 1500 m title in 1986). She set Canadian National records at 800 meters (2:00.02) and 1500 meters (4:03.36) in the 1983 season. She also came first in the women's mile run at the USA Indoor Track and Field Championships in 1984, and broke the National outdoor mile record with a (4:24.61) in Nice, France in 1986. She was a gold medal favourite for the 1500 meters at the Commonwealth Games in 1986 with the fastest time in the Commonwealth heading into the Games but caught a virus that was going around the athletes' village and had to withdraw from the competition.

She won three major medals during her career, all over 1500 m: she was the gold medallist at the 1981 Pacific Conference Games, and claimed bronze at both the 1985 IAAF World Indoor Games and the 1987 Pan American Games. She was also an 800 m gold medallist at the Francophonie Games.

McRoberts was a finalist at multiple global events, including the 1983 World Championships in Athletics, 1984 Summer Olympics, and the 1986 and 1990 Commonwealth Games. She represented the Americas in two middle-distance events at the 1981 IAAF World Cup and ran for Canada at the 1987 World Championships in Athletics (failing to make the final).

McRoberts graduated from Simon Fraser University with a degree in Kinesiology and Communications and later returned there becoming the head coach of the track and field programme under her married name, Brit Townsend.

International competitions

National titles
Canadian Track and Field Championships
800 m: 1981, 1983
1500 m: 1980, 1986
USA Indoor Track and Field Championships
Mile: 1984

References

External links
 
 
 
 
 
 


Living people
1957 births
Athletes from Copenhagen
Canadian female middle-distance runners
Olympic track and field athletes of Canada
Athletes (track and field) at the 1984 Summer Olympics
Pan American Games bronze medalists for Canada
Pan American Games medalists in athletics (track and field)
Athletes (track and field) at the 1979 Pan American Games
Athletes (track and field) at the 1987 Pan American Games
Commonwealth Games competitors for Canada
Athletes (track and field) at the 1986 Commonwealth Games
Athletes (track and field) at the 1990 Commonwealth Games
World Athletics Championships athletes for Canada
Danish emigrants to Canada
World Athletics Indoor Championships medalists
Medalists at the 1987 Pan American Games